Otto Greter (born 10 October 1910) was a Swiss fencer. He competed in the individual and team sabre events at the 1948 and 1952 Summer Olympics.

References

External links
 

1910 births
Year of death missing
Swiss male fencers
Olympic fencers of Switzerland
Fencers at the 1948 Summer Olympics
Fencers at the 1952 Summer Olympics